Curacautín, which means "Gathering Stone" in Mapudungun, is a commune and city in the Chilean province of Malleco. Curacautín is located 90 kilometres northeast of Temuco, in a valley near the volcanoes Tolhuaca, Lonquimay and Llaima, all of which can be seen from the city. Historically, it served as a highway of sorts for the Pehuenches that lived on either side of the Andes mountain range.

Volcanic origin 
This area is known for its natural environment, and the Conguillío and Tolhuaca National Parks, and Malleco and Malalcahuello-Nalcas National Reserves are close by.

History 
The fort at Curacautín was founded on March 12, 1882 by Gregorio Urrutia.

Between 1913 and 1915, two important structures (the railroad and the Greater City Hall) were built. In 1938, Mosso plywood factory began production, being the first in Chile to export plywood. This, coupled with the railroad, allowed products to be shipped all over Chile as well as internationally. This factory was one of the main employers of the commune, having a big impact in every aspect of the city. In 2000, FOCURA (formerly Mosso) its declares in bankruptcy, ending an era in Curacautín.

Wood from the forests of the Curacautín Valley was the first product jointly labelled as meeting Forest Stewardship Council (FSC) and Fairtrade International (FLO) standards, manufactured commercially by Swedish firm Kährs from 2011.

Demographics
Of these, 12,412 (73.1%) lived in urban areas and 4,558 (26.9%) in rural areas. Between the 1992 and 2002 censuses, the population fell by 6.4% (1,165 persons).

Administration
As a commune, Curacautín is a third-level administrative division of Chile administered by a municipal council, headed by an alcalde who is directly elected every four years. The 2008-2012 alcalde is Jorge Saquel Albarran (Ind.).

Within the electoral divisions of Chile, Curacautín is represented in the Chamber of Deputies by Enrique Estay (UDI) and Fuad Chahín (PDC) as part of the 49th electoral district, together with Victoria, Lonquimay, Melipeuco, Vilcún, Lautaro, Perquenco and Galvarino. The commune is represented in the Senate by Alberto Espina Otero (RN) and Jaime Quintana Leal (PPD) as part of the 14th senatorial constituency (Araucanía-North).

References

External links
  Municipality of Curacautín

19th-century fortifications in Chile
Communes of Chile
Populated places established in 1882
Populated places in Malleco Province
1882 establishments in Chile